Post Town is an unincorporated community in Kalmar Township, Olmsted County, Minnesota, United States, near Byron.  The community is located near the junction of Olmsted County Roads 103 and 105.

References

Unincorporated communities in Olmsted County, Minnesota
Unincorporated communities in Minnesota